Cytisus striatus is a species of flowering plant in the legume family known by the common names hairy-fruited broom and Portuguese broom. This plant is native to the west of the Iberian Peninsula and northwestern Morocco.

Description
This is a tall shrub often exceeding  in height. It is highly branched and sprawling. The sparse leaves are made up of small leaflets about a centimeter long each. The shrub bears yellow legume flowers and the pods are covered in white hairs.

This shrub is similar to its relative, Cytisus scoparius, but it can be distinguished by the paler shade of yellow of its flowers and by the hairy coat on its pods.

The sead of this plant can be spread by ants.

Invasive plant species
It is also known in other parts of the world as an introduced species. It was introduced to California in the 1960s as an erosion-controlling plant, but it 'escaped' and spread to become a major noxious weed, an invasive species colonizing in many habitats there. It is also caused ecological damages in Oregon.

This plant, beyond its native range, causes problems in many ways, including displacement of native species causing ecosystem degradation and loss, removing native plant food sources for wildlife, and a susceptibility to wildfire ignition and spread.

References

External links
Jepson Manual Treatment
USDA Plants Profile

striatus
Flora of Southwestern Europe